The men's team tournament of the 2013 Asian Table Tennis Championships was held from June 30 to July 3, 2013.

China won the final, beating Japan 3–0.

Medalists

Seeds

Championship division

Knockout stage

Quarterfinals

Semifinals

Final

References
 21st Asian Championships Busan 2013 Competition Schedule Draw and Results

2013 Asian Table Tennis Championships